No Time to Die is a 2021 spy film and the twenty-fifth in the James Bond series produced by Eon Productions, starring Daniel Craig in his fifth and final portrayal of fictional British MI6 agent James Bond. It was directed by Cary Joji Fukunaga from a screenplay by Neal Purvis, Robert Wade, Fukunaga and Phoebe Waller-Bridge. Léa Seydoux, Ben Whishaw, Naomie Harris, Jeffrey Wright, Christoph Waltz, Rory Kinnear and Ralph Fiennes reprise their roles from previous films, with Rami Malek, Lashana Lynch, Billy Magnussen, Ana de Armas, David Dencik and Dali Benssalah also starring. In No Time to Die, Bond has left active service with MI6 and is recruited by the CIA to find a kidnapped scientist, which leads to a showdown with a powerful adversary.

Development on the film began in 2016. It is the first James Bond film to be distributed by Universal Pictures, which acquired international distribution rights following the expiration of Sony Pictures' contract after the release of Spectre in 2015. United Artists Releasing holds the rights for North America, as well as worldwide digital and television rights; Universal also holds the worldwide rights for physical home media. Danny Boyle was originally attached to direct and co-write the screenplay with John Hodge. Both left in August 2018 due to creative differences, and Fukunaga was announced as Boyle's replacement one month later. Most of the cast had signed by April 2019. Principal photography took place from April to October 2019. Billie Eilish performed the theme song "No Time to Die", while Hans Zimmer scored the film.

After being delayed by Boyle's departure and later by the COVID-19 pandemic, No Time to Die premiered globally at the Royal Albert Hall in London on 28 September 2021. It was released in cinemas on 30 September 2021 in the United Kingdom and on 8 October 2021 in the United States. The film received positive reviews and grossed over $774 million worldwide, making it the fourth-highest-grossing film of 2021. In addition to this, it had earned several other box-office record achievements, including becoming the third-highest-grossing film of all time in the UK. The film was nominated for three awards at the 94th Academy Awards, winning Best Original Song, and received numerous other accolades.

Plot

A young Madeleine Swann witnesses the murder of her mother by Lyutsifer Safin, whose family was assassinated by Swann's father Mr. White under orders from Ernst Stavro Blofeld. Swann shoots Safin and flees, falling into a frozen lake, but Safin rescues her.

In the present, after Blofeld's arrest, Swann travels to Matera with James Bond. She asks Bond to visit the nearby grave of his ex-lover Vesper Lynd, where he survives an explosion orchestrated by Spectre operatives led by Primo, a mercenary with a bionic eye. Bond escapes with Swann but ends their relationship, believing that she betrayed him.

Five years later, Spectre agents extract MI6 scientist Valdo Obruchev, who is secretly working for Safin, from a laboratory in London and steal Project Heracles, a programmable DNA-targeting nanobot weapon developed under M's oversight. Retired and living in Jamaica, Bond is contacted by CIA ally Felix Leiter and State Department agent Logan Ash, who ask for Bond's help extracting Obruchev from a Spectre party in Cuba. Bond declines but later accepts after Nomi, his successor as Agent 007, warns him not to interfere with her own extraction of Obruchev and puts him in contact with M, who refuses to answer his questions about Heracles.

Bond infiltrates the party with Paloma, a Cuban agent assisting Leiter. Blofeld, overseeing the gathering from Belmarsh through Primo's bionic eye, disperses a nanobot mist to kill Bond. However, Obruchev reprogrammed the nanobots under Safin's orders to kill the Spectre members instead. Outmaneuvering Nomi with Paloma's help, Bond brings Obruchev to Ash and Leiter aboard a trawler. Ash, also working for Safin, shoots Leiter and traps him with Bond below deck, fleeing with Obruchev after blowing up the ship. Leiter dies of his wounds, but Bond escapes.

Bond returns to London seeking to interrogate Blofeld about Obruchev's employer, but Blofeld reportedly only speaks to his psychiatrist, Swann. Safin secretly forces Swann to infect herself with a nanobot dose to assassinate Blofeld. Meeting Swann in Belmarsh, Bond unknowingly infects himself with the nanobots by touching her. Swann is too distressed to confront Blofeld, who confesses to Bond that he planned the explosion at Vesper's grave to make Bond believe that Madeleine betrayed him. Enraged, Bond briefly strangles Blofeld, unknowingly allowing the nanobots to enter his system and kill him.

Bond tracks Swann to her childhood home in Norway, where they reconcile, and he meets her five-year-old daughter Mathilde. Swann insists she is not his child and shares intelligence her father gathered about Safin and the island his family owned. The following day, MI6 alert Bond that Ash is approaching, leading to a chase into a nearby forest. Bond defeats his thugs and kills Ash, avenging Leiter's death, but Safin abducts Swann and Mathilde.

Q provides Bond and Nomi with a submersible glider to infiltrate Safin's headquarters, a missile base in the Sea of Japan converted into a nanobot factory. Bond confronts Safin, who flees with Mathilde but later releases her, while Swann escapes and reunites with Bond and Mathilde. Nomi kills Obruchev by kicking him into a pool of acid, then escorts Swann and Mathilde off the island. Bond kills Safin's remaining men, including Primo, then stays to open the silo doors for missiles launched from HMS Dragon to penetrate. Bond rushes back inside when the silo doors begin closing but is ambushed by Safin, who infects him with a nanobot vial programmed to kill Swann and Mathilde. Bond shoots Safin dead and reopens the silo doors, but he chooses to remain on the island to keep Swann and Mathilde safe. He radios Swann to say goodbye, expressing his love for her and Mathilde, who she confirms is his daughter. The missiles strike the island and destroy the facility, killing Bond. 

Later, at MI6, M, Moneypenny, Nomi, Q, and Bill Tanner drink to Bond's memory. Driving Mathilde to Matera, Swann tells her a story about a man named James Bond.

Cast 

 Daniel Craig as James Bond:A former MI6 agent who was known as 007 during his service and has been retired for five years at the start of the film. Director Cary Joji Fukunaga compared Bond to a "wounded animal" and described his state of mind as "struggling to deal with his role as a '00 agent'. The world's changed. The rules of engagement aren't what they used to be. The rules of espionage are darker in this era of asymmetric warfare". Craig stated that the film is "about relationships and family".
 Léa Seydoux as Dr. Madeleine Swann: A psychotherapist, daughter of Mr. White, and Bond's love interest who assisted him in his mission in the film Spectre. Fukunaga underscored Madeleine's importance to the film, as her presence allowed him to explore Bond's unresolved trauma stemming from the death of Vesper Lynd in Casino Royale. After seeing the film, Seydoux said: "There's a lot of emotion in this Bond. It's very moving. I bet you're going to cry. When I watched it, I cried, which is weird because I am in it."
 Rami Malek as Lyutsifer Safin:A facially disfigured terrorist and scientist on a revenge mission against Spectre who later becomes Bond's adversary. Producer Barbara Broccoli described the character as "the one that really gets under Bond's skin. He's a nasty piece of work." Malek described the character as someone who considers "himself as a hero almost in the same way that Bond is a hero". Fukunaga described Safin as "more dangerous than anyone [Bond has] ever encountered" and a "hyper-intelligent and worthy adversary".
 Lashana Lynch as Nomi:A new "00" agent who entered active service some time after Bond's retirement and was assigned the 007 number. Lynch hoped that her character would bring a new layer of relatability to the world of espionage, saying "When you're dealing with a franchise that has been slick for so many years, I wanted to throw a human spin on it—to deal with anxiety and be someone who's figuring it out, completely on her toes".
 Ralph Fiennes as Gareth Mallory / M: Head of MI6 and Bond's superior officer.
 Ben Whishaw as Q:MI6's Quartermaster who outfits "00" agents with equipment for use in the field. In the film, Q is revealed to be gay when Moneypenny and Bond interrupt him planning a dinner date with another man. Whishaw considers his version of Q to have ended, saying: "I think I'm done now. I've done the three that I was ... contracted to do. So I think that might be it for me."
 Naomie Harris as Eve Moneypenny:M's secretary and Bond's ally. Harris says since Spectre, "Moneypenny has grown up somewhat. I think she still has her soft spot for Bond though, that's never going to go. But she's an independent woman with her own life".
 Jeffrey Wright as Felix Leiter:Bond's friend and a CIA field officer. Wright was asked what can be expected from Felix in the film, to which he replied, "Well, I think it's known that Felix pulls James back into the game and away we go from there". While Wright was surprised he was not asked to return in Skyfall and Spectre, he felt Felix's return in No Time to Die "gives more weight" due to his prior absence. Wright said that the film establishes the brotherhood of Bond and Felix, which he described as the "core" of their relationship.
 Billy Magnussen as Logan Ash: A CIA agent assigned by Leiter to support Bond in finding Obruchev. Ash is later revealed to be a double agent working for Safin.
 Christoph Waltz as Ernst Stavro Blofeld:Bond's arch-enemy and foster brother. He is the founder and head of the criminal syndicate Spectre and is now in MI6 custody. Fukunaga explained why Blofeld returns and teased the character's "new role" in the film by saying: "Blofeld is an iconic character in all the Bond films. He's in prison, but he certainly can't be done yet, right? So what could he be doing from in there and what nefarious, sadistic things does he have planned for James Bond and the rest of the world?"
 David Dencik as Dr. Valdo Obruchev: A rogue scientist who created Project Heracles.
 Rory Kinnear as Bill Tanner: M's chief of staff.
 Ana de Armas as Paloma: A CIA agent assisting Bond. De Armas described her character as "irresponsible" and "bubbly" and playing a key role in Bond's mission.
 Dali Benssalah as Primo: A mercenary and an adversary whom Bond first encounters in Matera.
 Lisa-Dorah Sonnet as Mathilde: The five-year-old daughter of James Bond and Madeleine Swann.

Additionally, Hugh Dennis and Priyanga Burford portray scientists working at an MI6 laboratory. Mathilde Bourbin and Coline Defaud appear as Madeleine Swann's mother and young Madeleine respectively in the film's opening sequence. Brigitte Millar also reprises her role as Spectre chief Dr. Vogel from Spectre.

Production

Development 

Development of No Time to Die began in early 2016. In March 2017, screenwriters Neal Purvis and Robert Wade—who have worked on every Bond film since The World Is Not Enough (1999)—were approached to write the script by producers Barbara Broccoli and Michael G. Wilson. Purvis and Wade mapped out the story for the film in 2017. Sam Mendes stated that he would not return after directing Skyfall and Spectre. Christopher Nolan ruled himself out to direct. By July 2017, Yann Demange, David Mackenzie and Denis Villeneuve were courted to direct. In December 2017, Villeneuve decided against the role due to his commitments to Dune.

In February 2018, Danny Boyle was established as frontrunner for the directing position. Boyle's original pitch to Broccoli and Wilson saw John Hodge writing a screenplay based on Boyle's idea with Purvis and Wade's version scrapped. Hodge's draft was greenlit, and Boyle was confirmed to direct with a production start date of December 2018. However, Boyle and Hodge left in August 2018 due to creative differences. It was reported at the time that Boyle's exit was due to the casting of Tomasz Kot as the lead villain; however, Boyle later confirmed the dispute was over the script. The release date became contingent on whether the studio could find a replacement for Boyle within sixty days. Cary Joji Fukunaga was announced as the new director in September 2018. Fukunaga became the first American to direct an Eon Productions Bond film and the first director to receive a writing credit for any version. Fukunaga had been considered for Spectre before Mendes was hired, and afterwards had expressed an interest to Broccoli and Wilson about directing a future Bond film. Linus Sandgren was hired as cinematographer in December 2018.

Purvis and Wade were brought back to start working on a new script with Fukunaga in September 2018. Casino Royale and Quantum of Solace screenwriter Paul Haggis turned in an uncredited rewrite in November 2018, with Scott Z. Burns doing the same in February 2019. At Daniel Craig's request, Phoebe Waller-Bridge provided a script polish in April 2019. Waller-Bridge is the second female screenwriter credited with writing a Bond film after Johanna Harwood co-wrote Dr. No and From Russia with Love. Barbara Broccoli was questioned about the MeToo movement at the Bond 25 launch event, where she stated that Bond's attitude towards women would move with the times and the films should reflect that. In a separate interview, Waller-Bridge argued that Bond was still relevant and that "he needs to be true to this character", instead suggesting that it was the films which had to grow and evolve, emphasising "the important thing is that the film treats the women properly".

Some concepts changed during development with Fukunaga. An early unrealised idea he considered was to have seen the film take place "inside Bond's head", while being tortured by Blofeld in Spectre, up until the end of act two of a three-act structure. Originally, Safin, the villain, and his henchman would wear masks based on Siberian bear-hunting armour. The henchman character was written out before filming, and Fukunaga requested changes to Safin's costume. A new mask based on Noh, a Japanese style of theatre, was introduced as Fukunaga felt that the original mask was dominating the costume.

Paloma's costume, a navy Michael Lo Sordo gown, was chosen by costume designer Suttirat Anne Larlarb to enable the character to fight alongside Bond while still being dressed elegantly and formally for the black tie event in the plot.

The film entered production under the working title of Bond 25. The title No Time to Die was announced on 20 August 2019. Broccoli said: "We were struggling to find a title. We wanted a title that wouldn't give away anything but would be understandable, and after you see the movie, have a deeper resonance, because that's often what Fleming titles are all about."

Writing 
When Boyle was hired, he pitched the film to take place in present-day Russia and explore Bond's origins; he left the production after Broccoli and Wilson "lost confidence" in the idea. During Boyle's time, a leaked casting sheet described the male leading role as a "cold and charismatic Russian" and the female leading role as a "witty and skillful survivor". Production also sought male supporting roles of Māori descent with "advanced combat skills". The idea of Bond having a child was introduced by Hodge and retained for the final script.

No Time to Die is the first Eon-produced film in which Bond actually dies. Craig first proposed killing Bond in 2006, after the premiere of Casino Royale; Broccoli agreed to the suggestion. Craig said, "It's the only way I could see for myself to end it all and to make it like that was my tenure, someone else could come and take over ... When he [Craig's Bond] goes, he can't come back." Wilson said it was "the fitting way to deal with a situation where a person is risking their life all the time. Eventually, the odds catch up with you." The production team considered several ways for Bond to die, including being shot by an anonymous shooter. However, Fukunaga said that a "conventional weapons death" felt inappropriate considering that Bond had been able to "escape from everything else". Craig said the team tried to create a sense of tragedy and weight by using Safin's bioweapon, which killed "the only thing that Bond wants in life ... to be with the people he loves".

Waller-Bridge was hired to revise dialogue, work on character development and add humour to the script. The character of Paloma was made more significant from originally being a simple contact; Purvis and Wade indicated this was probably written by Waller-Bridge at Fukunaga's request.

Casting 
After Spectre, there was speculation that it would be Craig's final Bond film. Immediately after the film's release, Craig had complained about the rigours of performing the part, saying he would rather "slash [his] wrists" than play Bond again. In May 2016, it was reported that Craig had received a $100 million offer from Metro-Goldwyn-Mayer to do two more Bond films, but turned it down. In October 2016, Craig denied having made a decision but praised his time in the role, describing it as "the best job in the world doing Bond". He further denied that $150 million was offered to him for the next two instalments. Eventually, Craig was paid $25 million for his involvement. In August 2017, on The Late Show with Stephen Colbert, Craig said that the next film would mark his final appearance as Bond. His position was reaffirmed between November 2019 and March 2020. Craig later acknowledged that the physicality of the part had deterred him from returning to the role, having sustained injuries shooting earlier Bond films. With Craig's departure, Broccoli said that No Time to Die would "tie up loose narrative threads" from Craig's previous Bond films and "come to an emotionally satisfying conclusion".

In December 2018, Fukunaga said that Ben Whishaw, Naomie Harris and Ralph Fiennes would all be reprising their roles in the film. Fukunaga also said that Léa Seydoux would be reprising her role as Madeleine Swann, making her the first female lead to appear in successive Bond films. Rory Kinnear returns as Bill Tanner, as does Jeffrey Wright as Felix Leiter. Wright makes his third appearance in the series after Casino Royale and Quantum of Solace and becomes the first actor to play Leiter three times. Ana de Armas, Dali Benssalah, David Dencik, Lashana Lynch, Billy Magnussen and Rami Malek were announced as cast members in a live stream, at Ian Fleming's Goldeneye estate in Jamaica. The event was on 25 April 2019 and marked the official start of production. Malek was further announced as playing Safin, the film's villain. Malek revealed in an interview that Safin would not be connected to any religion or ideology.

After the release of Spectre it was reported that Christoph Waltz had signed on to return as Blofeld for further Bond films, on the condition that Craig returned as Bond. Despite Craig's definite casting as Bond, Waltz announced in October 2017 that he would not return as Blofeld, but did not give a reason for his departure. Waltz's casting as Blofeld in No Time to Die was not announced at the press launch but was revealed in the trailer in December 2019.

Filming

Production was scheduled to begin on 3 December 2018 at Pinewood Studios, but filming was delayed until April 2019 after Boyle's departure. The film is the first in the series to have sequences shot with 65mm IMAX film cameras. Fukunaga and Sandgren pushed for using film over digital to enhance the look of the film. The budget was reported to be between $250 million and $301 million.

Filming locations included Italy, Jamaica, Norway, the Faroe Islands and London, in addition to Pinewood Studios. In March 2019, production started in Nittedal, Norway, with the second unit capturing scenes on a frozen lake. On 28 April 2019, principal photography officially began in Jamaica, including Port Antonio. In May 2019, Craig sustained an ankle injury while filming in Jamaica and subsequently underwent minor surgery. In June 2019, production was further interrupted when a controlled explosion damaged the 007 Stage at Pinewood Studios and left a crew member with minor injuries. Also in June 2019, production went back to Norway to shoot a driving sequence along the Atlantic Ocean Road featuring an Aston Martin V8 Vantage. Aston Martin also confirmed that the DB5, DBS Superleggera, and Valhalla models would feature in the film.

Production then moved to the UK. Scenes featuring Craig, Fiennes, Harris and Kinnear were filmed around London, including Whitehall, Senate House and Hammersmith. In July 2019, filming took place in the town of Aviemore and in the surrounding Cairngorms National Park area. Some scenes were also shot at the Ardverikie House Estate and on the banks of Loch Laggan, just outside the park. The forest scene was filmed in Buttersteep Forest in Windsor Great Park. In late August 2019, the second unit moved to southern Italy where they began to shoot a chase sequence involving an Aston Martin DB5 through the streets of Matera, including a doughnut in Piazza San Giovanni Battista. In early September 2019, the main production unit, Craig and Léa Seydoux arrived to film scenes inside several production-built sets, as well as further sequences in Maratea and Gravina in Puglia. Scenes were shot in the town of Sapri in southern Italy throughout September. Locations included the town's "midnight canal" and railway station. The city is referred to as "Civita Lucana" in the film. In late September 2019, scenes were filmed in the Faroe Islands.

The Ministry of Defence confirmed that filming took place around the Royal Navy destroyer HMS Dragon and a Royal Air Force C-17 aircraft, at RAF Brize Norton. No weapons were fired. The British Army's Household Cavalry unit was also filmed. Filming of an action sequence with a seaplane took place at CMA CGM’s Kingston Container Terminal in Jamaica. Whishaw praised Fukunaga's directing work, saying "It was great and you know what was amazing is that he treated it, or was able to approach it, it felt to me almost as if it were an independent film. You know? And it was quite improvisational... we didn't do many takes". He added, "It was very light. Sometimes quite chaotic, but I'm very excited to see how he's constructed the final film".

Principal photography wrapped up on 25 October 2019 at Pinewood Studios with the filming of a chase sequence set in Havana, Cuba. Production had intended to shoot the sequence earlier, but was forced to reschedule when Craig injured his ankle in Jamaica. Further pick-up shots at Pinewood were confirmed by Fukunaga on 20 December 2019.

Post-production 
Visual effects for No Time to Die were created by Industrial Light & Magic (ILM), Framestore, DNEG, and Cinesite. Charlie Noble was the visual effects supervisor. Post-production concluded without further changes, as the film's release date was delayed.

Music

In July 2019, Dan Romer was announced as composer for the film's score, having previously worked with Fukunaga on Beasts of No Nation and Maniac. Romer left the film due to creative differences in November 2019. Hans Zimmer replaced Romer by January 2020. It is the first time in the Bond series history that a composer has been replaced during post-production, and the second major personnel change for the film after Boyle's departure. Steve Mazzaro produced the score, while Johnny Marr played guitar. The No Time to Die score album was set to be released through Decca Records in March 2020 but was delayed to 1 October 2021 to coincide with the release of the film.

In January 2020, Billie Eilish was announced as the performer of the film's theme song, with her brother, Finneas O'Connell, serving as co-writer as well as the track's producer. The song, which has the same title, was released on 13 February 2020. At the age of 18, Eilish is the youngest artist to record a Bond theme song. The song's music video was subsequently released on 1 October 2020. Despite the film's delay, the song was nominated for and won the Grammy Award for Best Song Written for Visual Media at the 63rd Annual Grammy Awards, on 14 March 2021, six months before the film's release date, because the song itself was released during the 2019–20 eligibility period, in anticipation of the film's original April 2020 release date.

The song "Dans la ville endormie" by French singer Dalida is heard briefly in the opening scene. Louis Armstrong's version of "We Have All the Time in the World" is a recurring theme included three times within the score and originally appeared in On Her Majesty's Secret Service, recalling both love and loss experienced by Bond following a similar poignancy in this film. The track is played in full during the closing credits.

Release

Distribution rights 
The Sony Pictures contract to co-produce the Bond films with Metro-Goldwyn-Mayer and Eon Productions expired with the release of Spectre in 2015. In April 2017, Sony Pictures, Warner Bros. Pictures, 20th Century Fox, Universal Pictures, and Annapurna Pictures entered a bidding competition to win the distribution rights. MGM secured the North American, digital, and worldwide television rights to the film through its distribution arm United Artists Releasing. Universal became the international distributor and worldwide holder of the rights for physical home media (DVD and Blu-ray) through its subsidiary Universal Pictures Home Entertainment, prior to its joint venture agreement in January 2020 with Warner Bros. Home Entertainment.

Theatrical release and postponements

No Time to Die had its world premiere at the Royal Albert Hall in London on 28 September 2021, and was released in cinemas on 30 September 2021 in the UK and on 8 October 2021 in the US in 2D, RealD 3D, 4DX, ScreenX, Dolby Cinema and IMAX. The film also opened the same week in September in South Korea and the following week in October in Brazil, France, Germany, Ireland, Italy, the Netherlands and Russia. China and Australia would see the release later in October and November 2021. The film had the highest box office opening weekend takings in the UK for any Bond feature.

No Time to Die was originally scheduled for release in November 2019, but was postponed to February 2020 and then to April 2020 after Boyle's departure. The premiere in China and a countrywide publicity tour, planned for April 2020, were cancelled due to the early outbreak of COVID-19 in the country. By March 2020, the global spread of the virus and the declaration of a pandemic by the World Health Organization prompted a joint open letter from two Bond fan sites addressed to the producers. The letter asked that the release be delayed to minimise the risk of spreading the disease and to ensure the film's commercial success. On 4 March 2020, MGM and Eon Productions announced that after "thorough evaluation of the global theatrical marketplace" they had postponed the release until 12 November 2020 in the UK and 25 November 2020 in the US. No Time to Die was the first major film affected by the pandemic. According to Deadline Hollywood, MGM and Universal needed to assure a strong performance across all international markets. It was hoped that the rescheduling to November would ensure all cinemas, particularly those in China, South Korea, Japan, Italy, and France that were closed due to the pandemic, would be open and operational.

In the early stages of the pandemic, an estimated 70,000 cinemas in China closed, and countries including Australia and the UK closed cinemas to minimise the spread of the virus. Variety said the studio had already spent $66 million on promoting the film, while The Hollywood Reporter wrote that the delay cost MGM $30–50 million in wasted marketing costs, estimating that the global box office losses could have exceeded $300 million had the film stayed in its April 2020 slot. In October 2020, No Time to Die was delayed again to 2 April 2021. The decision to delay the release was made when it became apparent that theatrical markets, especially in the US, would not see full demand. After the delay was announced, the British chain Cineworld, the world's second-largest cinema chain, closed its cinemas indefinitely. Chief executive Mooky Greidinger said the delay of No Time to Die was the "last straw" for Cineworld following a string of other film delays and cancellations.

In January 2021, the film was rescheduled to 8 October 2021. In February 2021, an earlier release date of 30 September 2021 was announced for the UK. In August 2021, it was announced that the release date in Australia was delayed from 30 September to 11 November 2021, in response to their national lockdowns. It was also screened at the Zurich Film Festival on the same day as the world premiere and the first Bond film to be in the official selection at a festival. The release in China was on 29 October 2021.

Home media
Universal Pictures Home Entertainment released No Time to Die on DVD, Blu-ray and Ultra HD Blu-ray in the UK on 20 December 2021 and in the US on 21 December 2021. It was available from digital download services on 9 November 2021 in the US. The 31-day theatrical release window of the film is considered a relatively quick turnaround for a film of this size. One factor has been that Bond films attract an older audience and that demographic has been hesitant to return to cinemas during the pandemic.

No Time to Die was the top-ranking film on Vudu and Google Play for two weeks and iTunes for five weeks. In the UK, it was the highest-selling digital title of 2021, with more than 430,000 units sold. Upon its release in disc format, No Time to Die debuted atop the "NPD VideoScan First Alert" chart for both the overall disc sales and Blu-ray sales in the US. According to The Numbers, it sold a combined 380,902 Blu-ray and DVD units in the first week for a revenue of $9.7 million. It was the top-selling-title on both charts for three weeks. It also debuted at the first position on Redbox's disc rental charts and second on its digital charts. According to the NPD Group, it sold the eighth-highest amount of DVDs and Blu-rays in 2021, and the second-highest in December 2021.

In the UK, it ranked atop the Official Film Chart for three weeks. The film was the highest-selling title on disc in the country during 2021 with 1.15 million units being sold, including 717,500 DVD and Blu-ray units being sold within two weeks. It was also the highest-selling Blu-ray title of 2021 with 237,000 units sold, in addition to becoming the highest-selling title on 4K Blu-ray in the first week of release and selling the highest number of discs for any title in first week of release since 2017 with 621,000 Blu-ray and DVDs being sold. In addition, it sold a combined 780,000 units across digital platforms and retail in the final week of 2021.

Reception

Box office 
, No Time to Die has grossed $160.9 million in the United States and Canada and $613.3 million in other territories, for a worldwide total of $774.2 million. It was the fourth-highest-grossing film of 2021. Because of the combined production and promotional costs of at least $350 million, it was estimated that the film would have needed to gross at least $800 million worldwide in order to break even.

No Time to Dies opening weekend set a $119.1 million box office from 54 countries, including the United Kingdom, Brazil, Germany, Italy, Japan, Mexico and Spain, besting its $90 million projections. It was the first film since the COVID-19 pandemic that crossed $100 million in an overseas debut without the China market. The Hollywood Reporter stated the premiere was the biggest in the United Kingdom since the pandemic began. In the United States and Canada, No Time to Die was projected to gross $65–85 million in its opening weekend. The film made $23.3 million on its first day, including $6.3 million from Thursday night previews (which included $1 million from Wednesday previews), the best total of the franchise. It went on to debut to $55.2 million, topping the box office and marking the fourth-best opening weekend of the franchise. No Time to Die earned an additional $6.9 million on Columbus Day, bringing its four-day total in the United States and Canada to $62.2 million. Deadline Hollywood attributed the slight underperformance to the film's 163-minute runtime limiting the number of showtimes. TheWrap said that the opening was good news for cinemas, even if the studio did not break even during the film's theatrical run, and that it was an encouraging sign for upcoming adult-oriented pictures. The film fell 56% in its second weekend to $24.3 million, finishing second behind newcomer Halloween Kills. No Time to Die was re-released in IMAX for the weekend ending on 23 January 2022 as part of the 60th anniversary of the Bond film series.

No Time to Die became the highest-grossing film of 2021 in Europe, the Middle East and Africa, surpassing F9 on 17 October. In China, the film opened to a $28.2 million weekend, displacing The Battle at Lake Changjin from the top rank on the country's box office, despite 13% of cinemas being closed due to China's policies against local COVID-19 outbreaks. It remained atop the box office charts during its second weekend despite a drop of 59%, earning $11.4 million for a cumulative total of $49.2 million according to Artisan Gateway. It became the highest-grossing non-Chinese film of 2021 outside the United States and Canada on 14 November, earning an estimated $24 million for a cume of $558.2 million, which included $126 million in the United Kingdom, $70 million in Germany and $57.9 million in China. It also opened to an $8.2 million weekend in Australia, which was the biggest opening for any film since December 2019.

During the weekend of 19–21 November, No Time to Die overtook F9 to become the highest-grossing non-Chinese film of 2021, reaching a global cume of around $734 million as it grossed an estimated $2.6 million in the United States and Canada, as well as $13.4 million from 72 countries outside the two territories. It overtook Spectre the following weekend to become the third-highest-grossing film in the United Kingdom as well as the second-highest-grossing Bond film in the market with a gross of $129.9 million.

Critical response 
The critics consensus states: "It isn't the sleekest or most daring 007 adventure, but No Time to Die concludes Daniel Craig's franchise tenure in satisfying style." Metacritic assigned the film a weighted average score of 68 out of 100 based on 66 critics, indicating "generally favorable reviews". Audiences polled by CinemaScore gave the film an average grade of "A−" on an A+ to F scale, while those at PostTrak gave it an 83% positive score, with 63% saying they would definitely recommend it.

The film received praise from many film critics. Peter Bradshaw of The Guardian called it "an epic barnstormer" delivered "with terrific panache" and with "pathos, action, drama, camp comedy, heartbreak, macabre horror, and outrageously silly old-fashioned action". Robbie Collin of The Daily Telegraph described it as "extravagantly satisfying", "often very funny" with gadgets "both improbable and outrageous", and that it has been filmed with "gorgeous" cinematography, starting with "a sensationally thrilling and sinister prologue" and ending with a "moving conclusion". Kevin Maher of The Times wrote: "It's better than good. It's magnificent"; he later named the film one of the best films of 2021.

Barry Hertz of The Globe and Mail wrote that the film "makes sure that my eyes are following each and every oh-whoa stunt. As well as guaranteeing that I actually care about whether (or, really, how) Bond gets out of this one." Mick LaSalle of the San Francisco Chronicle wrote that the film "takes its place among the best of the entire series", and concluded "Craig leaves the series in a mammoth, 163-minute extravaganza that audiences will be enjoying for decades. It's a lovely thing to see." K. Austin Collins of Rolling Stone described the film as being "just fine: sometimes intriguing, sometimes not, sometimes boring, sometimes not", adding: "It's a bit more successful if we think of it instead as a tribute to the Craig era, and to the star himself." Michael O'Sullivan of The Washington Post gave the film 3/4 stars, writing that it was "a bit too long and a bit too complicated", but added that it was "also a fittingly complicated and ultimately perversely satisfying send-off for the actor". Peter Rainer of The Christian Science Monitor gave the film 3/5 stars, writing: "It offers up the requisite thrills, stunts, and bad guys. Beautiful people abound, and 007 still knows how to fill out a tux." However, he questioned "Has James Bond become irrelevant?"

Conversely, some critics found fault with the film. John Nugent of Empire criticised its length (2 hours and 43 minutes), asserting that the plotting and exposition in the middle third "doesn't justify that heaving runtime". Nevertheless, he thought the film "a fitting end to the Craig era". Kyle Smith of National Review also criticised the film's length, and described it as "the least fun and most somber excursion in the entire Bond series". Clarisse Loughrey of The Independent found it uneventful and disappointing: its core premise of a biological weapon of mass destruction was described as "generic spy nonsense", while she felt that Rami Malek "gives almost nothing to the role beyond his accent and stereotyped disfigurement makeup". David Sexton of New Statesman wrote that the film "shows signs of emerging from an over-deliberated, market-sensitised production process", adding: "It delivers the set-pieces without ever trying to connect them with any urgency, almost like an anthology or re-mix." Brian Tallerico of RogerEbert.com gave the film a score of 2/4 stars, writing: "For something that once felt like it so deftly balanced the old of a timeless character with a new, richer style, perhaps the biggest knock against [the film] is that there's nothing here that hasn't been done better in one of the other Craig movies."

Accolades 

At the 94th Academy Awards, No Time to Die received nominations for Best Sound and Best Visual Effects, and won Best Original Song, becoming the third film to do so after Skyfall and Spectre. The film's other nominations include five British Academy Film Awards (winning one), two Critics' Choice Movie Awards (winning one), and a Golden Globe Award (which it won).

See also 
 Outline of James Bond
 Production of the James Bond films

Notes

References

External links 

 
  at James Bond official website
  at Metro-Goldwyn-Mayer official website
  at MGM official website
 
 
 Official screenplay

James Bond films
2021 3D films
2021 films
2020s American films
2020s British films
2020s English-language films
2020s spy films
4DX films
American action drama films
American action thriller films
American sequel films
American spy action films
American spy drama films
American spy thriller films
Biological weapons in popular culture
British action thriller films
British action drama films
British sequel films
British spy action films
British spy drama films
British spy thriller films
Eon Productions films
Films about bioterrorism
Films about the Central Intelligence Agency
Films about the Secret Intelligence Service
Films about mother–daughter relationships
Films about terrorism
Films directed by Cary Joji Fukunaga
Films postponed due to the COVID-19 pandemic
Films produced by Barbara Broccoli
Films produced by Michael G. Wilson
Films scored by Hans Zimmer
Films set in 2015
Films set in 2020
Films set in Basilicata
Films set in Jamaica
Films set in London
Films set in Norway
Films set in Santiago de Cuba
Films set in the Pacific Ocean
Films set in Washington, D.C.
Films set on fictional islands
Films shot in Apulia
Films shot in Basilicata
Films shot in Berkshire
Films shot in Campania
Films shot in England
Films shot in the Faroe Islands
Films shot in Jamaica
Films shot in London
Films shot in Matera
Films shot in Norway
Films shot in Oslo
Films shot in Scotland
Films shot at Pinewood Studios
Films that won the Best Original Song Academy Award
Films with screenplays by Cary Joji Fukunaga
Films with screenplays by Neal Purvis and Robert Wade
Films with screenplays by Phoebe Waller-Bridge
IMAX films
Metro-Goldwyn-Mayer films
ScreenX films
Universal Pictures films